Survey is a ghost town in Medicine Township, Rooks County, Kansas, United States.

History
Survey was issued a post office in 1880. The post office was discontinued in 1890.  There is nothing left of Survey.  There is a Survey Cemetery still in existence.

References

Former populated places in Rooks County, Kansas
Former populated places in Kansas
1880 establishments in Kansas
Populated places established in 1880